Ermanno Aebi (13 January 1892 – 22 November 1976) was an Italian-Swiss footballer who played as a midfielder.

Club career
Born in Milan to a Swiss father and an Italian mother, at the age of 16 Aebi was contracted by Internazionale. He contributed to the team's first ever scudetto (1910), as well as to the club's second league title, ten years later.

International career
Aebi was the first oriundo to play for the Italy national team, on 18 January 1920, against France and scored a hat-trick in Italy's 9–4 win.

Personal life
Aebi's son Giorgio was a player in Calcio Como. Ermanno died in 1976.

External links
Profile at FIGC.it

1892 births
1976 deaths
Footballers from Milan
Italian footballers
Association football midfielders
Italy international footballers
Inter Milan players
Italian people of Swiss descent